= Textbook of Cystic Fibrosis =

Medical textbook edited by John D. Lloyd-Still

- Title page for Textbook of Cystic Fibrosis (1983)
- Editor: John D. Lloyd-Still
- Publisher: John Wright-PSG
- Publication date: 1983
- Pages: 498
- ISBN: 9780723670261
- OCLC: 8688253

Textbook of Cystic Fibrosis is a medical textbook, published in 1983 by John Wright-PSG. It was edited John D. Lloyd-Still and had 27 contributors in total, including Still. It contained little in the way of information published post-1980. Contemporary reviews described it as one of the first major reference works on cystic fibrosis.
